Peskovatka is a rural locality (a selo) and the administrative center of Peskovatskoye Rural Settlement, Dubovsky District, Volgograd Oblast, Russia. The population was 1,289 as of 2010. There are 41 streets.

Geography 
Peskovatka is located in steppe, on the west bank of the Volgograd Reservoir, 11 km northeast of Dubovka (the district's administrative centre) by road. Dubovka is the nearest rural locality.

References 

Rural localities in Dubovsky District, Volgograd Oblast